The 2009 New Mexico Bowl was a post-season American college football bowl game, held on December 19, 2009, at University Stadium on the campus of the University of New Mexico in Albuquerque, New Mexico, as part of the 2009–10 NCAA bowl season. The game, telecast on ESPN, featured the Wyoming Cowboys from the Mountain West Conference and the Fresno State Bulldogs from the WAC.This was the first trip to the New Mexico Bowl for Wyoming. It was also their first trip to a post season bowl game since the 2004 season when the Cowboys defeated the  24–21 in the Pioneer PureVison Las Vegas Bowl. This marked Fresno State's second straight trip to the New Mexico Bowl; they were defeated 40–35 by Colorado State in the 2008 contest. Before the 2009 New Mexico Bowl, Wyoming and Fresno State had played each other a total of six times, playing in consecutive years from 1992–1997 as rivals in the Western Athletic Conference; the teams have split their match-ups with each squad winning three games.  The last meeting in 1997 was won by Fresno State, 24–7.

Behind freshman quarterback Austyn Carta-Samuels, Wyoming upset Fresno State 35–28 in the game, which went into double overtime after a late field goal by Cowboy kicker Ian Watts. Carta-Samuels threw three touchdowns in the win including the game-winner in overtime, a 13-yard strike to David Leonard.

Game summary
Wyoming wore their home Brown uniforms, and Fresno wore white visitor uniforms. Wyoming freshman Austyn Carta-Samuels, the offensive MVP, threw for 201 yards and three touchdowns including the game-winning 13-yard touchdown pass to David Leonard. Defensive MVP Mitch Unrein tallied six tackles and two sacks for the Wyoming defense including a forced fumble midway through the 4th quarter which led to the game-tying field goal.  Wyoming stopped the nation's leading rusher, Fresno State's Ryan Mathews, on three rushing attempts from the 1 in the first overtime. The Bulldogs tried a quarterback sneak on third down, and Mathews came up short again on fourth down.

Scoring summary

Statistics

Game Notes
Matthews led the nation in rushing for the 2009 season.
Wyoming was playing in its first bowl since 2004.
Carta-Samuels was the Mountain West Freshman of the Year.
Fresno State made its second straight appearance - and loss - in the New Mexico Bowl.

References

External links
 Box Score - ESPN

New Mexico Bowl
New Mexico Bowl
Fresno State Bulldogs football bowl games
Wyoming Cowboys football bowl games
2009 in sports in New Mexico
December 2009 sports events in the United States